Taurus Poniatovii (Latin for Poniatowski's bull) was a constellation created by the former rector of Vilnius University, Marcin Odlanicki Poczobutt, in 1777 to honor Stanislaus Poniatowski, King of Poland and Grand Duke of Lithuania. It consisted of stars that are today considered part of Ophiuchus and Aquila. It is no longer in use. It was wedged in between Ophiuchus, Aquila and Serpens Cauda. A depiction of the constellation can be found on the wall of the Vilnius University Astronomical Observatory.

The stars

The stars were picked for the resemblance of their arrangement to the Hyades group which form the "head" of Taurus. Before the definition of  Taurus Poniatovii, some of these had been part of the obsolete constellation River Tigris.
The brightest of these stars is 72 Oph (3.7 magnitude) in the "horn" of Taurus Poniatovii. The "face" of Taurus Poniatovii is formed by 67 Oph (4.0), 68 Oph (4.4) and 70 Oph (4.0).
The five brightest stars belong to loose open cluster Collinder 359 or Melotte 186. Barnard's star is also inside the boundaries of this former constellation. Some minor stars (5th and 6th magnitude) now in Aquila formed the "rear" of Taurus Poniatovii.

See also
List of stars in Ophiuchus
Scutum, a constellation  created in 1684 by Polish astronomer Johannes Hevelius (Jan Heweliusz), to commemorate the victory of the Polish forces led by King John III Sobieski in the Battle of Vienna.

References

External links
 http://www.pa.msu.edu/people/horvatin/Astronomy_Facts/obsolete_pages/taurus_poniatovii.htm
 http://www.ianridpath.com/startales/poniatowski.htm

Former constellations
Ophiuchus (constellation)
Cattle in culture